Year of the Monkey is the fourth studio album by the American band Pushmonkey, released one week after the end of the year of the Monkey, running from January 22, 2004 through February 8, 2005 (see 2005 in music).

Track listing
All songs composed by Pushmonkey

"Rescue Me" – 3:26
"Stuck Out" – 3:17
"Sorry" – 3:12
"The Greatest" – 3:40
"Too Good to Be True" – 3:49
"Falling Out" – 3:20
"Fake" – 4:30
"10,000 Miles" – 3:48
"Lie to Me" – 3:46
"Reason to Be Loved" – 3:11
"I'm Down" – 4:17

Credits
Pushmonkey
Tony Park – lead vocals
Darwin Keys – drums, vocals
Will Hoffman – guitar, vocals
Pat Fogarty – bass, vocals
Howie Behrens – guitar, vocals

References

Pushmonkey albums
2005 albums